Clayton Jimmie (born 10 July 1995) is a South African swimmer. He competed in the men's 4 × 100 metre freestyle relay event at the 2017 World Aquatics Championships.

In April 2022, at the 2022 South Africa National Swimming Championships, Jimmie won the bronze medal in the 50 metre freestyle with a time of 22.82 seconds, achieved a qualifying time for the 2022 World Aquatics Championships in the event and was named to the South Africa roster in the event for the 2022 World Championships. On day five of the World Championships, held at Danube Arena in Budapest, Hungary, he placed 55th in the 100 metre freestyle with a time of 50.68 seconds. Later in the same prelims session, he placed eighteenth in the 4×100 metre mixed medley relay, splitting a 56.05 for the butterfly leg of the relay. Two days later, he placed 43rd in the 50 metre freestyle with a time of 22.74 seconds.

At the 2022 Commonwealth Games, held in Birmingham, England in July and August, Jimmie qualified for the semifinals of the 50 metre butterfly ranking 16th with a time of 24.17 seconds in the preliminaries. Later in the same preliminaries session, he was part of the South Africa relay team that was disqualified in the 4×100 metre mixed freestyle relay. For the semifinals of the 50 metre butterfly later the same day, he did not advance to the final, placing seventh in his semifinal heat. The following day, he helped qualify the 4×100 metre freestyle relay to the final ranking sixth, splitting a 50.28 for the second leg of the relay in the morning preliminaries. In the evening final, he lowered his split time for the second leg of the relay to a 50.12 to contribute to a time of 3:23.41 and sixth-place finish.

Day five of competition at the 2022 Commonwealth Games, Jimmie ranked fourteenth in the preliminaries of the 50 metre freestyle with a time of 22.98 seconds, qualifying for the semifinals. He placed eleventh in the semifinals with a time of 22.62 seconds.

References

External links

1995 births
Living people
African Games bronze medalists for South Africa
African Games gold medalists for South Africa
African Games medalists in swimming
African Games silver medalists for South Africa
Commonwealth Games bronze medallists for South Africa
Commonwealth Games medallists in swimming
Commonwealth Games silver medallists for South Africa
Swimmers at the 2015 African Games
South African male swimmers
Swimmers at the 2014 Commonwealth Games
Swimmers at the 2022 Commonwealth Games
Competitors at the 2015 Summer Universiade
Competitors at the 2017 Summer Universiade
Sportspeople from Durban
20th-century South African people
21st-century South African people
Medallists at the 2014 Commonwealth Games